Cornova is a village in Ungheni District, Moldova.

References

Villages of Ungheni District